The In Sound is an album by American jazz saxophonist Eddie Harris recorded in 1965 and released on the Atlantic label. The album features Harris' first recording of "Freedom Jazz Dance" which would become a jazz standard after featuring on Miles Davis' album Miles Smiles (Columbia, 1966).

Reception
The Allmusic review states "This is one of Eddie Harris' great records".

Track listing
All compositions by Eddie Harris except as indicated
 "Love Theme from "The Sandpiper" (The Shadow of Your Smile)" (Johnny Mandel, Paul Francis Webster) - 5:31
 "Born to Be Blue" (Mel Tormé, Robert Wells) - 5:12
 "Love for Sale" (Cole Porter) - 6:04
 "Cryin' Blues" - 4:48
 "'S Wonderful" (George Gershwin, Ira Gershwin) - 4:43
 "Freedom Jazz Dance" - 9:45
Recorded in New York City on August 9, 1965 (tracks 1 & 4) and August 30, 1965 (tracks 2, 3, 5 & 6)

Personnel
Eddie Harris - tenor saxophone
Ray Codrington - trumpet (tracks 3, 4 & 6)
Cedar Walton - piano
Ron Carter - bass
Billy Higgins - drums

References 

Eddie Harris albums
1966 albums
Albums produced by Nesuhi Ertegun
Atlantic Records albums